Eoret Narasha is a settlement in Kenya's Narok County.

References 

Populated places in Narok County